St Thomas of Aquin's High School is a state-funded Catholic secondary school in the Tollcross area of Edinburgh.

History
St Thomas of Aquin’s College for the training of Catholic teachers was formally established in 1865 by the Sisters of Mercy at St Catharine's Convent on Lauriston Gardens, Edinburgh. It expanded its remit and in 1886 the all-girls St Thomas of Aquin's College was established.  In 1905 the Higher Grade Department of the college, where ‘Secondary Education’ was provided, was officially recognised by the then Education Department. The college retained its ‘Primary’ Department until World War II. In 1975 boys were admitted and the school was given its own catchment area in the city.

The Sisters of Mercy adapted the ancient coat of arms, given to the original Order of Mercy by King James of Aragon, for the school’s badge. The school is named after Thomas Aquinas, a very influential thirteenth century philosopher and theologian.

Christopher Santini is the permanent Headteacher having been Acting Headteacher since 2016.

Facilities
The school is located in the Tollcross area of Edinburgh beside the original convent. The building was upgraded in 1961. In 1997 one of the main staircases collapsed. The new 750 pupil St Thomas of Aquin’s High School was opened in August 2002. It was built on the site of the old school following closure of the building in 1998 as it had become unsuitable to meet safety, security and curriculum requirements. It could also not be converted to support the integration of pupils with special needs. It was the first of Edinburgh’s £133m Smart School Initiative programme to be completed. The building won the ‘SCALA Civic Building of the Year Award’, and a ‘Designshare Award’. The building was also designed in association with the O.E.C.D. Programme for Educational Buildings, Paris.

Academics
St Thomas has been ranked as one of the top twenty state secondary schools in Scotland.

Notable alumni
 Christophe Berra - Footballer
Greg McHugh - actor

References

External links 
 Official School Website

Catholic secondary schools in Edinburgh
1886 establishments in Scotland
Educational institutions established in 1886